The Volvo P2 platform is a global full-size unibody automobile platform developed and produced by Volvo. It is designed for single wheelbases and is adaptable to front- or all wheel drive configurations. It was developed by the automaker before its 1999 acquisition by Ford Motor Company, and debuted with the 1998 Volvo S80.

The platform was in use from 1998 and was slowly phased out beginning in 2006. The first generation XC90 remained in production until 2014 at which point it was the only model still in production based on this platform. For the Chinese market a special version of the XC90 called XC Classic was made from 2014 to 2016. After the second generation XC90 had been launched in all markets the platform was retired.

Vehicles

References

1998 introductions
P2